Rochon Sands is a summer village on Buffalo Lake in central Alberta, Canada. It is south of Rochon Sands Provincial Park. The summer village and the park take their name from the Rochon family who owned the land in the early 1900s.

Demographics 

In the 2016 Census of Population conducted by Statistics Canada, the Summer Village of Rochon Sands had a population of 86 living in 47 of its 152 total private dwellings, a  change from its 2011 population of 65.

See also 
List of communities in Alberta
List of summer villages in Alberta
List of resort villages in Saskatchewan

References

External links 

1929 establishments in Alberta
Summer villages in Alberta